Oceans of Sadness was a progressive metal band from Belgium.

History
Oceans of Sadness were featured in 1996 with a Demo of the Month in the Dutch metal magazine Aardschok .

They released their first album, For We Are, in 2000. One year later, they played for the first time at Graspop Metal Meeting, the most famous Belgian metal festival. They would return there in 2003 and 2007. Oceans of Sadness received airtime  for their single So Close by music television channels TMF and JIMtv.

Oceans of Sadness have been supporting acts for a.o. Dimmu Borgir, Within Temptation and Obituary.

Band members
 Tijs Vanneste (vocals)
 Hans Claes (keyboards)
 Wim Melis (guitar)
 Tom Van Cauwenberghe (guitar)
 Jo Van Heghe (bass)
 Guy Vernelen (drums)

Discography
 Between Heaven, Earth and Beauty (1998)
 For We Are (2000)
 Laughing Tears, Crying Smile (2002)
 Send in the Clowns (2004)
 Mirror Palace (2007)
 The Arrogance of Ignorance (2008)

External links
Oceans Of Sadness at MySpace 

Alternative metal musical groups
Belgian heavy metal musical groups
Musical groups established in 1995
Musical groups disestablished in 2011
Scarlet Records artists